CAL Community School District is a public school district headquartered in Latimer, Iowa.

The district is mostly in Franklin County with a section in Wright County, and serves Latimer, Alexander, and Coulter.

History
Previously it had a grade-sharing program with the Dows Community School District, with each district having its own elementary school, Dows operating the middle school, and CAL operating the high school. Circa 2004, the CAL district had 241 students. In the 2016–17 school year the district had 261 students.

As a way to lower costs, the district was scheduled to begin sharing a superintendent with the Hampton–Dumont Community School District in 2016. The school board of Hampton–Dumont CSD approved the arrangement, effective July 1 that year. In 2018, the district entered into a whole grade-sharing agreement with Hampton–Dumont, sending its secondary students there.

Schools
CAL Elementary School, Lattimer
Secondary students attend Hampton–Dumont Community School District through a grade sharing agreement.

Athletics
Prior to the agreement, the CAL Cadets competed in the Iowa Star Conference.
 1987 boys' class 1A track & field state champions

References

External links
 CAL Community School District

School districts in Iowa
Education in Franklin County, Iowa
Education in Wright County, Iowa